The Virgins is a Hindi short film directed by Sandeep A. Varma starring Divyendu Sharma, Pia Bajpai and Akshay Oberoi. 
It is a take on the (non)issue of virginity in current India.

Cast
Piaa Bajpai
Akshay Oberoi
Divyendu Sharma
Pratik Kothari

Production

Filming

The filming took place in May 2016 in a small seaside town in Dahanu.

References

External links

2016 films
Indian short films
2010s Hindi-language films